Wang Su (195–256), courtesy name Ziyong, was an official and Confucian scholar of the state of Cao Wei during the Three Kingdoms period of China. He was a son of Wang Lang. When Guanqiu Jian started a rebellion in Shouchun, Wang Su advised Sima Shi to lower the rebels' morale by treating their families with respect. Following that, Wang Su entreated Cao Mao to allow Sima Zhao to succeed Sima Shi as regent of Wei.

Wang Su's daughter, Wang Yuanji, married Sima Zhao and gave birth to Sima Yan, the first emperor of the Jin dynasty, in 236. Thus, Wang Su became a grandfather himself. Wang Su inherited the title and marquisate of Marquis of Lanling from his father.

Wang Su compiled the extant edition of the Kongzi Jiayu (School Sayings of Confucius), the sayings of Confucius not included in the Analects. Scholars long suspected it was a forgery by Wang Su, but a book discovered in 1977 from the Shuanggudui tomb (sealed in 165 BCE), entitled Ru Jia Zhe Yan (Sayings of the Ru School), contains very similar content to the Kongzi Jiayu.

See also 
 Lists of people of the Three Kingdoms

Notes

References 

 Chen, Shou (3rd century). Records of the Three Kingdoms (Sanguozhi).
 Fang, Xuanling (ed.) (648). Book of Jin (Jin Shu).
 Pei, Songzhi (5th century). Annotations to Records of the Three Kingdoms (Sanguozhi zhu).

Cao Wei politicians
195 births
256 deaths
Politicians from Handan
Three Kingdoms philosophers
Cao Wei historians
Historians from Hebei
Philosophers from Hebei
Chinese Confucianists
3rd-century Chinese historians